"Plastic Loveless Letter" is a song by Australian alternative rock band Magic Dirt. Following the promotional singles "Vulcanella" and "Watch Out Boys", the song was released as the official lead single from the band's fourth studio album Tough Love in November 2003. The single peaked at number 34 in Australia, becoming the band's highest charting single after becoming a radio staple.

The song polled in position 35 in the Triple J Hottest 100, 2003.

Track listings

Charts

Release history

References

 
2003 singles
2003 songs
East West Records singles
Warner Music Australasia singles